Wish You Were Here is a 2012 Australian mystery drama film directed by Kieran Darcy-Smith and starring Felicity Price, Joel Edgerton, Teresa Palmer, and Antony Starr. Set in Cambodia and Australia, it details the aftermath of a Southeast Asian holiday gone awry for two couples.

Plot
Dave Flannery reluctantly vacations in Cambodia with his pregnant wife Alice, her younger sister Steph and new boyfriend Jeremy. After a night of partying, Jeremy vanishes without a trace. Dave and the women return to their lives, each bearing differing degrees of knowledge about what happened and slowly put the pieces of the puzzle together to find out what happened that night.

Dave reveals he slept with Steph on the beach. He went back to the hotel, but Alice was asleep. He goes for a walk and meets a man, who offers to take him to a small bar. Dave went and began drinking. The customers at the bar began harassing him and tried to get him to take a prostitute, but he declined. He gets angry and throws all his money at them. He tells them he doesn't want the prostitute, but will pay for her. The men drag an 8-year-old girl from the backroom. Horrified, Dave begins screaming at them. Jeremy comes out of a backroom and apologises for Dave, trying to calm the men down. The men lure Jeremy and Dave outside. Dave threatens to call the police on the men for child prostitution, but Jeremy tells Dave the men are the Vietnamese mafia. In a fight, Jeremy is stabbed to death. Dave is restrained and the men find his address. They say that if he tells anyone, they will go to his house and kill his family.

In the present, Alice gets into an argument with Dave. She goes to Steph's house and confronts her. On the way home, she gets into a car accident and is rushed to the hospital, where she prematurely gives birth to the baby. In the end, Dave tells the police the truth of Jeremy's death.

Cast

Joel Edgerton as Dave Flannery
Teresa Palmer as Steph McKinney
Felicity Price as Alice Flannery
Antony Starr as Jeremy King

Reception

Awards and nominations

References

External links

2012 films
2012 thriller drama films
2010s mystery thriller films
Australian thriller drama films
Australian mystery thriller films
Films about vacationing
2012 directorial debut films
2012 drama films
2010s English-language films